This is a list of the first women lawyer(s) and judge(s) in Oklahoma. It includes the year in which the women were admitted to practice law (in parentheses). Also included are women who achieved other distinctions such becoming the first in their state to graduate from law school or become a political figure.

Firsts in state history

Lawyers 

First female to pass the Oklahoma Territory Bar: Minerva K. Elliott Lentz (1893)  
First (half-Shawnee) female: Laura Lykins (1898) 
First female from Oklahoma admitted before the U.S. Supreme Court: Ethel Maude Proffit Stephenson

Law Clerk 

 First (Native American-Chickasaw Nation) female to clerk for the Oklahoma Supreme Court and Criminal Court of Appeals: Jessie Elizabeth Randolph Moore in 1926

State judges 

 First female (judicial officer): Faye L. Roblin in 1921
First female: Grace Elmore Gibson in 1930 
First female (Oklahoma Court of Civil Appeals): Patricia MacGuigan in 1982  
 First female (Oklahoma Supreme Court): Alma Wilson (1941) in 1982 
 First African American female: Susan Bragg in 1985 

First female (Oklahoma Court of Criminal Appeals): Rita M. Strubhar in 1993  
First female (Chief Justice; Oklahoma Supreme Court): Alma Wilson (1941) in 1995

Federal judges 
First female (United States Magistrate Judge in the six-state Tenth Circuit): Robin Cauthron in 1991  
First African American female (U.S. District Court for the Western District of Oklahoma): Vicki Miles-LaGrange (1977) in 1994 
 First female (U.S. District Court for the Northern District of Oklahoma): Claire Eagan in 2001 
 First female (U.S. District Court for the Eastern District of Oklahoma): Kimberly E. West 
 First African American female (Chief Judge; U.S. District Court for the Western District of Oklahoma): Vicki Miles-LaGrange (1977) in 2008

Attorney General of Oklahoma 

 First female: Susan B. Loving from 1991-1995

Assistant Attorney General  

 First female: Kathryn Van Leuven from 1922-1928

United States Attorney 

First (African American) female (Western District of Oklahoma): Vicki Miles-LaGrange (1977) in 1993  
First female hired (Western District of Oklahoma): Susie Pritchett

County Attorney (abolished office) 

 First female: Amelia Patterson Frye

Assistant County Attorney (abolished office) 

 First female: Margaret Lamm

District Attorney 

 First female: Kay Huff in 1978

Political Office 

 First openly lesbian female (Oklahoma House of Representatives): Kay Floyd in 2012

Oklahoma Bar Association 

 First female vice-president: Jayne Montgomery in 1978 
First female president: Mona Salyer Lambird from 1990-1991

Firsts in local history

 Irma J. Newburn: First female (and African American female) district judge in Western Oklahoma
 Kay Huff: First female to serve as a District Attorney for Cleveland, Garvin and McClain Counties, Oklahoma (1978)
 Laura Austin Thomas: First female District Attorney for Logan and Payne Counties, Oklahoma (2014)
 Bernice Dona Berry Beckham: First female to serve as the Assistant District Attorney in Oklahoma City, Oklahoma
 Reta Strubhar: First female to serve as a Judge of the District Court of Canadian County, Oklahoma (1984)
 Ada Lois Sipuel Fisher: First African American female admitted to the University of Oklahoma College of Law (1948)
 Bernice Dona Berry Beckham: First female to serve as the Assistant District Attorney in Oklahoma City, Oklahoma
 Lisa Shaw: First female to become an Associate District Judge in Comanche County, Oklahoma (2014)
 Susie Pritchett: First female elected as a judge in Kingfisher County, Oklahoma
 Bernice Dona Berry Beckham: First female to serve as the Assistant District Attorney in Oklahoma City, Oklahoma
 Elizabeth Kerr: First female to serve as a judge in Edmond, Oklahoma [Oklahoma County, Oklahoma]
 Susie Pritchett: First female lawyer hired by Oklahoma County's Public Defender's Office
 Maxey Reilly: First female judge in Okfuskee County, Oklahoma (2017)
 Vicki Behenna: First female to serve as the District Attorney for Oklahoma County, Oklahoma (2022)
 Freddie "Fred" Andrews: First female judge in Pontomac County, Oklahoma
 Bernice Dona Berry Beckham: First female to serve as the Assistant District Attorney in Oklahoma City, Oklahoma
 Wilma Palmer: First African American female to serve as a Judge of the Tulsa County District Court, Oklahoma (2007)
 Chloe Eunice Passly Dilday: First female judge in Washington County, Oklahoma

See also  

 List of first women lawyers and judges in the United States
 Timeline of women lawyers in the United States
 Women in law

Other topics of interest 

 List of first minority male lawyers and judges in the United States
 List of first minority male lawyers and judges in Oklahoma

References 

Lawyers, Oklahoma, first
Oklahoma, first
Women, Oklahoma, first
Women, Oklahoma, first
Women in Oklahoma
Oklahoma lawyers
Lists of people from Oklahoma